Reza Khatibi is an Iranian filmmaker.

Biography
At 16 he moves to France for secondary schooling. Fascinated by the silver screen he enters the artistic scene by joining the "Théatre de l'Atelier", directed by Jean Darnel. As he learns the ropes and forms a group of aficionados, he eventually directs his first short film, "l'enfer". Satisfied by the results the group of actors joined him for his second short film, "le tourbillon".

In 2002, he directs his first feature film, "7 Days in Teheran", with his friends from the theatre. The movie was produced by Jean-Marie Boulet from "Artefilm" and co-written by Reza Khatibi, Esfandiar Esfandi and Anahita Maafi. Released in France in 2002 the movie quickly gathered praise from international movie festivals.
It won the Viewer's Choice award at the Bergamo film meeting in Italy and was acclaimed at the Fajr festival in 2003.

Finding inspiration in the Cohen brothers' "The Big Lebowski", Reza Khatibi writes and directs in 2007 "Dar shahr khabari nist, hast". The movie was cowritten with Hadi Hossein Nejad and produced by Mostafa Shayeste from Hedayat Film.

In 2009 he cowrites with Mehdi Hossein Nejad "L'enclave", the first Iranian fantastic thriller. It was nominated at the Amiens festival in France. The movie he directed and cowrote with Behrooz Forooghi in 2016, "A Hell of a Wedding", brings him some fame. It is the first 3D Iranian movie. It received two awards, the Grand Prix at the Lieges 3D festival as well as the jury's prize at the Korean international 3D film festival.

Filmography

Cinema

 2002: 7 Days in Tehran
 2007: Dar shahr khabari nist
 2009: L'enclave
 2016: Brawl in the Wedding

References

External links

Date of birth missing (living people)
Living people
Iranian film directors
Iranian screenwriters
People from Tehran
Year of birth missing (living people)